The 1965–66 Scottish Second Division was won by Ayr United who, along with second placed Airdrieonians, were promoted to the First Division. Forfar Athletic finished bottom.

Table

References

Scottish Football Archive

Scottish Division Two seasons
2
Scot